
Gmina Kamieniec Ząbkowicki is a rural gmina (administrative district) in Ząbkowice Śląskie County, Lower Silesian Voivodeship, in south-western Poland.

Neighbouring gminas
Gmina Kamieniec Ząbkowicki is bordered by the gminas of Bardo, Paczków, Ząbkowice Śląskie, Ziębice and Złoty Stok.

Villages
The gmina contains the villages of Byczeń, Chałupki, Doboszowice, Kamieniec Ząbkowicki, Mrokocin, Ożary, Pomianów Górny, Sławęcin, Sosnowa, Śrem, Starczów, Suszka and Topola.

Twin towns – sister cities

Gmina Kamieniec Ząbkowicki is twinned with:
 Bílá Voda, Czech Republic
 Ellzee, Germany

References

Kamieniec Zabkowicki
Ząbkowice Śląskie County